Edita Raková (born 18 May 1978 in Humenné, Czechoslovakia) is a Slovakian ice hockey defender.

International career
Raková was selected for the Slovakia national women's ice hockey team in the 2010 Winter Olympics. She played in all five games, but did not record a point. She played in all three games of the 2010 Olympic qualifying campaign.

Raková also appeared for Slovakia at seven IIHF Women's World Championships, across three levels. Her first appearance came in 2005. She appeared at the top level championships in 2012.

Career statistics

International career

References

External links
Eurohockey.com Profile
Sports-Reference Profile

1978 births
Living people
Ice hockey players at the 2010 Winter Olympics
Olympic ice hockey players of Slovakia
Sportspeople from Humenné
Slovak women's ice hockey defencemen
Slovak expatriate ice hockey people
Expatriate ice hockey players in Austria
Slovak expatriate sportspeople in Austria